1982–83 was the eighth season that Division 1 operated as the second tier of ice hockey in Sweden, below the top-flight Elitserien (now the SHL).

Format
Division 1 was divided into four starting groups of 10 teams each. The top two teams in each group qualified for the Allsvenskan, while the remaining eight teams had to compete in a qualifying round in which the results carried over from the first round. The top two teams from each qualifying round qualified for the playoffs. The last team in each of the qualifying groups was relegated directly to Division 2, while the second-to-last-place team had to play in a relegation series.

Of the eight teams in the Allsvenskan, the top two teams qualified for the Allsvenskan final, with the winner being promoted directly to the Elitserien (now the SHL), while the loser qualified for the Kvalserien, which offered another opportunity to be promoted. The third to sixth ranked teams in the Allsvenskan qualified for the second round of the playoffs. The two playoff winners qualified for the Kvalserien, in which the first-place team qualified for the following Elitserien season.

Regular season

Northern Group

First round

Qualification round

Western Group

First round

Qualification round

Eastern Group

First round

Qualification round

Southern Group

First round

Qualification round

Allsvenskan

Final 
 Södertälje SK - Luleå HF 3:0 (7:3, 8:2, 5:2)

Playoffs

First round 
 Piteå IF - Skövde IK 2:0 (6:2, 10:2)
 Bofors IK - Kiruna AIF 1:2 (3:2, 1:7, 3:5)
 Huddinge IK - Mörrums GoIS 2:1 (7:3, 4:7, 6:3)
 IK Vita Hästen - Väsby IK 0:2 (4:7, 3:5)

Second round 
 Timrå IK - Piteå IF 2:0 (4:3 OT, 7:1)
 Västerås IK - Huddinge IK 2:0 (3:2 OT, 7:6 OT)
 Örebro IK - Kiruna AIF 2:0 (13:0, 9:2)
 HV71 - Väsby IK 2:0 (8:6, 6:5 OT)

Third round 
 Örebro IK - Timrå IK 1:2 (3:4, 5:1, 3:4)
 HV71 - Västerås IK 2:1 (11:2, 2:4, 4:0)

Elitserien promotion

External links
Season on hockeyarchives.info

Swedish Division I seasons
2
Swe